Jack Creek is a  stream in southern Minnesota in the United States.  It is a tributary of Heron Lake, the outlet of which flows to the Des Moines River.

According to Warren Upham, Jack Creek was probably named for the jackrabbits near the creek.

See also
List of rivers of Minnesota
Minnesota Watersheds
USGS Hydrologic Unit Map - State of Minnesota (1974)

References

Rivers of Jackson County, Minnesota
Rivers of Nobles County, Minnesota
Rivers of Minnesota